The Broncho Twister is 1927 American silent Western film starring Tom Mix. The film is lost.

Cast
 Tom Mix as Tom Mason 
 Tony the Horse as Tom's Horse (as Tony the Wonder Horse) 
 Helene Costello as Paulita Brady 
 Nancy Drexel as Daisy Mason (Credited as Dorothy Kitchen) 
 Malcolm Waite as Dan Bell 
 George Irving as Ned Mason 
 Paul Nicholson as Black Jack Brady 
 Doris Lloyd as Teresa Brady 
 Jack Pennick as Jinx Johnson 
 Otto Fries as Sheriff

See also
 Tom Mix filmography
 1937 Fox vault fire

References

External links 
 
 
 

1927 Western (genre) films
1927 films
American black-and-white films
Fox Film films
Lost Western (genre) films
Lost American films
1927 lost films
Silent American Western (genre) films
1920s American films